Pabna Class is the class of a riverine patrol crafts of Bangladesh. The ships of this class are the first ever made in Bangladesh warships. Currently Bangladesh Coast Guard operates them.

History

Pabna Class patrol craft was built at Dockyard and Engineering Works Limited. This ships were the first ships of Bangladesh Navy. Later on, in 1995, after the emergence of Bangladesh Coast Guard, the ships were transferred to them.

Design
They have a displacement of 75 tons and a complement of 33 personnel. The ships carry one Bofors 40 mm gun of 60 cal. as armament. This patrol crafts can be used for coastal patrolling also besides riverine patrolling.

Ships in the class

See also
List of historic ships of the Bangladesh Navy
List of ships of the Bangladesh Coast Guard

References

Patrol vessels of the Bangladesh Navy
Patrol boat classes